The 2011 Arab Athletics Championships was the seventeenth edition of the international athletics competition between Arab countries which took place in Al Ain, United Arab Emirates from 26–29 October.

Medal summary

Men

Women

Medal table

Overall

Men

Women

See also
Athletics at the 2011 Pan Arab Games

References

Championnats Arabes Sur Piste 2011 . Tunis Athle. Retrieved on 2013-10-13.
Pan Arab Championships, Al Ain (United Arab Emirates) 26-29/10/2011. Africa Athle (2011-10-29). Retrieved on 2013-10-13.

Arab Athletics Championships
Athletics competitions in the United Arab Emirates
Sport in Al Ain
Arab Athletics Championships
Arab Athletics Championships
International sports competitions hosted by the United Arab Emirates